In mathematics, a cubic plane curve is a plane algebraic curve  defined by a cubic equation

applied to homogeneous coordinates  for the projective plane; or the inhomogeneous version for the affine space determined by setting  in such an equation. Here  is a non-zero linear combination of the third-degree monomials 

These are ten in number; therefore the cubic curves form a projective space of dimension 9, over any given field . Therefore, we can find some cubic curve through any nine given points, which may be degenerate, and may not be unique, but will be unique and non-degenerate if the points are in general position; compare to two points determining a line and how five points determine a conic. If two cubics pass through a given set of nine points, then in fact a pencil of cubics does, and the points satisfy additional properties; see Cayley–Bacharach theorem.

A cubic curve may have a singular point, in which case it has a parametrization in terms of a projective line. Otherwise a non-singular cubic curve is known to have nine points of inflection, over an algebraically closed field such as the complex numbers. However, only three of these points may be real, so that the others cannot be seen in the real projective plane by drawing the curve. The nine inflection points of a non-singular cubic have the property that every line passing through two of them contains exactly three inflection points.

The real points of cubic curves were studied by Isaac Newton. The real points of a non-singular projective cubic fall into one or two 'ovals'. One of these ovals crosses every real projective line, and thus is never bounded when the cubic is drawn in the Euclidean plane; it appears as one or three infinite branches, containing the three real inflection points. The other oval, if it exists, does not contain any real inflection point and appears either as an oval or as two infinite branches. Like for conic sections, a line cuts this oval at, at most, two points.

A non-singular plane cubic defines an elliptic curve, over any field  for which it has a point defined. Elliptic curves are now normally studied in some variant of Weierstrass's elliptic functions, defining a quadratic extension of the field of rational functions made by extracting the square root of a cubic. This does depend on having a -rational point, which serves as the point at infinity in Weierstrass form. There are many cubic curves that have no such point, for example when  is the rational number field.

The singular points of an irreducible plane cubic curve are quite limited: one double point, or one cusp. A reducible plane cubic curve is either a conic and a line or three lines, and accordingly have two double points or a tacnode (if a conic and a line), or up to three double points or a single triple point (concurrent lines) if three lines.

Cubic curves in the plane of a triangle 
Examples shown below use two kinds of homogeneous coordinates:  trilinear and barycentric.

To convert from trilinear to barycentric in a cubic equation, substitute as follows:

to convert from barycentric to trilinear, use

Many equations for cubics have the form

In the examples below, such equations are written more succinctly in "cyclic sum notation", like this:

.

A construction of  follows. Let  be the reflection of line  about the internal angle bisector of angle , and define  and  analogously. In trilinear coordinates, if  then

Neuberg cubic

Trilinear equation: 

Barycentric equation: 

The Neuberg cubic (named after Joseph Jean Baptiste Neuberg) is the locus of a point  such that  is on the line , where  is the Euler infinity point ( in the Encyclopedia of Triangle Centers).

For a graphical representation and extensive list of properties of the Neuberg cubic, see K001 at Berhard Gibert's Cubics in the Triangle Plane.

Thomson cubic

Trilinear equation: 

Barycentric equation: 

The Thomson cubic is the locus of a point  such that  is on the line , where  is the centroid.

For graphs and properties, see K002 at Cubics in the Triangle Plane.

Darboux cubic

Trilinear equation:
 
Barycentric equation: 

The Darboux cubic is the locus of a point  such that  is on the line , where  is the de Longchamps point.

For graphics and properties, see K004 at Cubics in the Triangle Plane.

Napoleon–Feuerbach cubic
Trilinear equation: 
 
Barycentric equation: 

The Napoleon–Feuerbach cubic is the locus of a point  is on the line , where  is the nine-point center, ( in the Encyclopedia of Triangle Centers).

For a graphics and properties, see K005 at Cubics in the Triangle Plane.

Lucas cubic

Trilinear equation: 
 
Barycentric equation: 

The Lucas cubic passes through the centroid, orthocenter, Gergonne point, Nagel point, de Longchamps point, other triangle centers, the vertices of the anticomplementary triangle, and the foci of the Steiner circumellipse.

For graphics and properties, see K007 at Cubics in the Triangle Plane.

1st Brocard cubic
Trilinear equation:
 
Barycentric equation: 

Let {{math|△A'B'C'}} be the 1st Brocard triangle. For arbitrary point , let  be the intersections of the lines  with the sidelines  respectively.

The 1st Brocard cubic passes through the centroid, symmedian point, Steiner point, other triangle centers, and the vertices of the 1st and 3rd Brocard triangles.

For graphics and properties, see K017 at Cubics in the Triangle Plane.

2nd Brocard cubic
Trilinear equation: 
 
Barycentric equation: 

The 2nd Brocard cubic is the locus of a point  for which the pole of the line  in the circumconic through  and  lies on the line of the circumcenter and the symmedian point (i.e., the Brocard axis). The  cubic passes through the centroid, symmedian point, both Fermat points, both isodynamic points, the Parry point, other triangle centers, and the vertices of the 2nd and 4th Brocard triangles.

For a graphics and properties, see K018 at Cubics in the Triangle Plane.

1st equal areas cubic

Trilinear equation: 
 
Barycentric equation: 

( in the Encyclopedia of Triangle Centers).

The 1st equal areas cubic passes through the incenter, Steiner point, other triangle centers, the 1st and 2nd Brocard points, and the excenters.

For a graphics and properties, see K021 at Cubics in the Triangle Plane.

2nd equal areas cubic
Trilinear equation: 

Barycentric equation:

The 2nd equal areas cubic passes through the incenter, centroid, symmedian point, and points in Encyclopedia of Triangle Centers indexed as X(31), X(105), X(238), X(292), X(365), X(672), X(1453), X(1931), X''(2053), and others.

For a graphics and properties, see K155 at Cubics in the Triangle Plane.

See also 
 Cayley–Bacharach theorem, on the intersection of two cubic plane curves
 Twisted cubic, a cubic space curve
 Elliptic curve
 Witch of Agnesi
 Catalogue of Triangle Cubics

References
.
.
.
.
.
.
.
. 
.
. See Chapter 8 for cubics.
.
.
.
.

External links
 A Catalog of Cubic Plane Curves (archived version)
 Points on Cubics
 Cubics in the Triangle Plane
 Special Isocubics in the Triangle Plane (pdf), by Jean-Pierre Ehrmann and Bernard Gibert

Algebraic curves